Zinaida Kalpokovaitė-Vogėlienė  (born 2 March 1941) is a Lithuanian textile artist.

She graduated from the Lithuanian Institute of Fine Arts in 1966. Her works use unconventional materials and different techniques. Her output is characterized by a delicate sense of aesthetic, technological excellence, innovation, tapestries often abstract expressionist in composition style, and she often uses bright or subtle colors. Since 1965 she has participated in exhibitions in Lithuania and abroad. Her works are on display in the Lithuanian Art Museum, Lithuanian National Museum, and National Museum of Fine Arts (Čiurlionis).

References

Lithuanian painters
1941 births
Living people
Artists from Vilnius
Vilnius Academy of Arts alumni
20th-century Lithuanian women artists
21st-century Lithuanian women artists
20th-century women textile artists
20th-century textile artists
21st-century women textile artists
21st-century textile artists